Brett Randall (15 September 1884 – c. 1 July 1963) was an British-born Australian actor and theatre director. He was the of Melbourne's Little Theatre, which became St Martins Youth Arts Centre.

History
Randall was born in England, the only son of Henrietta Randall (c. 1870 – 26 April 1939) who played as "Henrietta Cavendish" in the Leon Gordon Company and Herbert Randall (c. 1858 – 1 February 1942), at one time manager of Daly's Theatre, London and an old Savoyard who, as "Herbert Ralland", appeared in the first production of Utopia, Limited and in several other Gilbert and Sullivan operettas.

He was one of the cast members who came to Melbourne from London to appear in Ian Hay's comedy The Sport of Kings at the Athenaeum Theatre in 1926, opened at the Palace Theatre, Sydney, in August 1926, followed at the "Palace" by In the Next Room in December 1929 and The Enemy in January 1930 and Australian dramatist Isabel Handley's Handcuffs for One at the Savoy Theatre in March 1930.

By this time, the Great Depression was squeezing family incomes, and the "talkies" provided a cheaper form of amusement than live theatre, so many professional actors were forced to supplement their reduced incomes by other forms of employment, but kept their names before the public in repertory theatre. In 1931 Randall and Hal Percy, both "between engagements", founded a "little theatre" to present quality drama to the theatre-loving public at moderate prices. Their first venue was a kiosk at Fawkner Park, South Yarra, and slowly attracted a dedicated audience.
After a few years they lost their lease and Percy left to pursue a career in radio. Led by Randall, they changed their name to the Melbourne Little Theatre Company, and took a lease on St Chad's, a small disused church in the same district, and set about converting it to a theatre for an audience of around a hundred. It was not ideal: the stage was too small (4.5 by 3.5 metres), and there was no backstage or fly area, but the talented and hard-working company prospered and for twenty years produced each year eight 3-week seasons of high-class dramatic productions.
A notable new member in 1934 was Irene Mitchell, whose talent and enthusiasm were noted by Randall, who acted as a kind of mentor, encouraging her to take on increasingly responsible roles, until by 1950 she was producing most of the company's more challenging productions.

In 1948 Randall founded "Everyman Theatre", a touring company managed by Max Bruch, which took plays to country centres.

Personal
Randall was described as tall, usually wearing a beret, and possessing a gruff voice.
His portrait, by L. Scott Pendlebury, was a finalist for the 1956 Archibald Prize.

Randall had two sisters, Lady Cecil Rodwell of Holbrook, Suffolk, and Betty, Mrs Ian Wilson-Johnstone. Neither is known to have visited Australia. Their parents spent their last years in Melbourne.

His son Peter Randall was associated with St Martin's Theatre, a later incarnation of St Chad's.

He is not to be confused with Brett Randall, manager of Jigsaw Theatre in the 1980s and producer of Crazy For You at the State Theatre, Melbourne, in 1997.

Notes

References 

1884 births
1963 deaths
Australian stage actors
Australian theatre directors
Australian theatre managers and producers

External links
See  for a detailed list of Randall's stage appearances.